The following is a list of topics related to New York City, New York, United States.

Architecture
Lists dealing with architecture:
 List of bridges and tunnels in New York City
 List of full-block structures in New York City
 List of tallest buildings in New York City

Culture
Lists of:
 Books on New York City
 Books set in New York City
 Movies set in New York City
 Museums and cultural institutions
 Newspapers and magazines
 People from New York City
 People from Brooklyn
 People from the Bronx
 List of people from Staten Island
 Notable burials at Woodlawn Cemetery
 Songs about New York City
 Sports teams
 Television and Film studios
 Television shows set in New York City
 Video games set in New York City

Economy
 Assets owned by the New York Times Company
 Major corporations

Education
 Colleges and universities
 High schools

Geography
Neighborhoods:
 Bronx neighborhoods
 Brooklyn neighborhoods
 Manhattan neighborhoods
 Queens neighborhoods
 Staten Island neighborhoods

Streets:
 Streets in the Bronx (category)
 Streets in Brooklyn (category)
 Streets in Manhattan (category)
 Streets in New York City (category)

Other:
 Minor islands

History and politics
Lists of:
 Borough Presidents
 Borough Presidents (lists)
 Borough Presidents (category)
 City Comptrollers since 1898
 City Council (Board of Aldermen before 1938):
 Presiding Officers since 1898
 Present City Council membership
 Present and Historical City Council membership (category)
 Fire Commissioners
 Community Districts
 Community boards of the Bronx
 Community boards of Brooklyn
 Community boards of Manhattan
 Community boards of Queens
 Community boards of Staten Island
 Gang members (1825-1920)
 Health Commissioners (1870 to the present)
 Mayors and mayoral elections
 Mayors of the City of Brooklyn (1834–1897)
 Mayors of New York City (listed from 1664 to the present)
 Mayoral elections (since 1897)
 New York City: the 51st State (1969 Mailer-Breslin candidacy)
 Mayors of Brooklyn (category)
 Mayors of New York City (category)
 Police Commissioners
 Timeline of New York City history
 Timeline of the Bronx
 Timeline of Brooklyn
 Timeline of Queens
 Timeline of Staten Island
 Timeline of New York City crimes and disasters
 State government:
 Governors
 Members of the State Assembly
 Members of the State Senate

Tourism, recreation, and landmarks
Lists of:
 Beaches
 Hotels
 Gardens
 Parks
 Prisons (category)

Transportation
Lists of:
 Airports in and around New York City
 Metropolitan Transportation Authority (category)
 Subway inter-division connections
 Subway inter-division transfers
 Subway lines
 Subway R-type contracts
 Subway services
 Subway stations
 Subway terminals
 Subway yards
 Transportation in New York City (category)